Nikolai Lukyanchikov (born May 23, 1989) is a Russian professional ice hockey defenceman who currently plays for HC Spartak Moscow of the Kontinental Hockey League (KHL).

References

External links

Living people
HC Spartak Moscow players
Russian ice hockey defencemen
1989 births
Avangard Omsk players
Universiade medalists in ice hockey
Universiade gold medalists for Russia
Competitors at the 2011 Winter Universiade